Tecchio is an Italian surname. Notable people with the surname include:

Alan Tecchio, American singer
Andrea Tecchio (born 1987), Italian footballer
Marco Tecchio (born 1994), Italian cyclist
Sebastiano Tecchio (1807–1886), Italian lawyer and politician

Italian-language surnames